Transportation in Navotas is provided by cars, bicycle pedicab, tricycles, boats , bus, jeepney and taxi.

Bicycle, pedicabs, and tricycles

Bicycle pedestrian cabs are a popular transport in the whole city, as being composed of small and short streets, it is popular used in the whole city. It also attracts tourists because of its complex design that is different from the pedicabs of other cities.

Tricycles are also used in the city as substitute of bicycle pedicabs.

Bus
Navotas is also a hotspot of buses. C-4 Road between Tanong, Malabon and Navotas West is the most popular bus stopover.

Commuter boats
Commuting in boats is popular in the city. Because of its geographic location characteristics by Manila Bay, it is widely used. The pier of commuting boats are located in San Roque, Navotas that connects to Tanza, Navotas, which is separated by water.

Jeepney
Jeepneys are Navotas's distinctive local style of shared taxi.

Transportation in Metro Manila
Navotas
Navotas